Polistichus connexus is a species of beetle in the family Carabidae that is found in Bulgaria and Romania. The species is brownish-black coloured.

References

External links

Beetles described in 1785
Beetles of Europe